"Harlequin (software)" is a raster image processor first released in 1990 under the name ScriptWorks running as a command-line application to render PostScript language files under Unix. It was developed by Harlequin, a software company based in Cambridge, England.

History
ScriptWorks was created in 1986 as the final year University project of software developer Andy Cave. The project was dedicated to building a subset of a postscript interpreter that could preview the conversion of LaTeX to PostScript so that the PhD students would use less paper on the new LaserWriter. Although only a subset was required, Cave ended up creating quite a complete implementation. In 1987, Cave joined Harlequin Limited, founding the RIP division.

In the early 1990s, Harlequin was commissioned by Xenotron to develop a raster image processor to run on Macintosh computers to drive their Ultre-based image setters, exposing onto film and resin-coated paper. The Macintosh version proved successful, and Harlequin signed up a number of other Original equipment manufacturer (OEM) partners to sell it, including Pongrass, ECRM, Autologic, Xitron, Koronix, Purup, Graphic Enterprises and Compose.

In 1992, a DOS variation of ScriptWorks was developed, and was also sold through OEM partners, before being replaced by a version running under Microsoft Windows in 1993.

In 1999, Harlequin went into receivership and was bought by Global Graphics. The Harlequin Group, including all staff and assets, was renamed to Global Graphics Software Limited. The Unix-based command-line version of ScriptWorks was phased out, and a few years later ScriptWorks was renamed to Harlequin RIP.

RIP variants
From 2004 onwards Global Graphics expanded the reach of the Harlequin RIP by producing a number of variants for different market sectors:
 The Harlequin Server RIP (HSR) is designed for use in most production print segments other than pure-play digital press systems. It includes a graphical user interface (GUI) and can accept files from a wide variety of sources and export rasters to a huge number of output devices and file formats using input and output plugins.
 The Harlequin Host Renderer (HHR) is designed for use in digital front ends (DFEs) for digital production presses. It can be integrated very tightly with the rest of the system and can be effectively implemented in large RIP farms. HHR can also be integrated into software applications where there's a need for creation of raster representations of pages.
 The Harlequin Embedded SDK (EBD) is designed for use on controller-boards embedded within home and office printers.

The Harlequin RIP is sold only through OEM partners, each of whom builds it into their own prepress system, Digital Front End (DFE) or controller. It is therefore sold under a variety of names and it is not always easy to identify whether a system uses a Harlequin RIP or not.

RIP capabilities
Current versions of the Harlequin RIP can interpret:
 PostScript language files
 Portable Document Format (PDF)
 XML Paper Specification (XPS)
 Encapsulated PostScript (EPS)
 Desktop Color Separations (DCS)
 Tagged Image File Format (TIFF)
 JPEG
 JPEG 2000
 JPEG XR / HD Photo
 Bitmap Image (BMP)

The Harlequin Embedded SDK also supports  Printer Command Language 5e, PCL 5c and PCL XL, including HPGL and Printer Job Language (PJL).

All file formats are interpreted natively, without conversion to an intermediate format (PDF is not converted to PostScript and vice versa, for example). Global Graphics claims that processing without conversion allows for higher speeds and avoids artifacts arising from the conversion.

Native processing of live transparency in PDFs was recognized by several awards: Publishing Essential's Impact Award for "RIP of the Year" in 1997 and 1998 and the Silver Award in the Pre-press News and Publishing Awards of 1997 for "RIP/Server product of the year".

The Harlequin RIP also explicitly supports PDF/X-1a:2001, PDF/X-1a:2003, PDF/X-3:2002, PDF/X-3:2003, PDF/X-4, PDF/X-4p, PDF/X-5g and PDF/X-5pg and can be set to reject files that do not comply with those standards, or to include conformance information on the control strip of a proof.

Harlequin's OEM partners have built DFEs with full support for additional formats such as the Personalized Print Markup Language (PPML) around the Harlequin RIP.

A number of extra components are available for the variants of the Harlequin RIP, leading to descriptions of the Harlequin Server RIP as a "prepress workflow in a box". Included and additional options include:

 ColorPro – in-RIP color management (formerly known as Harlequin ICC Profile Processor (HIPP)). (Available in EBD, HHR, HSR).
 Font emulation – if a PostScript or PDF file is submitted to the RIP and does not include all of the fonts required embedded within it, and if those fonts are also not pre-installed in the RIP then they can be emulated to provide a reasonable simulacrum of the original font. The emulated fonts match the widths, weight and general style of the missing font and it is claimed that reproduction is usually good enough that a reader who had not seen the page with the original fonts in place would not notice any issues. Font emulation is therefore very useful for quick-print and corporate reproduction departments, and for display advertising in publication and newsprint. Global Graphics was presented with a GATF Intertech award in 2007 for font emulation. (Available in EBD, HHR, HSR).
 Harlequin Cross-Modulated screening (HXM) – this halftone technology combines aspects of stochastic and conventional screens to retain fine detail without the problems of noise occasionally encountered with pure stochastic screens. (Available in HHR, HSR).
 Harlequin Dispersed Screening (HDS) – this stochastic screening technology can be used to retain fine detail in images. (Available in EBD, HHR, HSR).
 JDF support – the JDF Enabler can be added to a Harlequin RIP to enable it to accept jobs in CIP4's Job Definition Format (JDF). The Harlequin RIP with the JDF Enabler was the first product to be formally certified by CIP4 in 2004. (Available in HSR).
 Open Prepress Interchange (OPI) – 'thin' PostScript and PDF files containing low resolution "For position only" (FPO) images may be submitted to the RIP, which will replace the image data with high-resolution files held locally. The equivalent Desktop Color Separations (DCS) format is also supported, as are reference XObjects in PDF files. (Available in HHR, HSR).
 PDF Retained Raster – a technology designed to maximize performance of Variable data printing (VDP) jobs, even if they are delivered as basic PDF files instead of a specialist VDP format. Shared page backgrounds are identified and rendered only once, then merged with variable text foregrounds. (Available in HHR, HSR).
 Simple imposition – fully automated in-RIP imposition of PDF files for 2- and 4-up saddle stitch, 4-up perfect binding, step & repeat, cut & stack etc. (Available in EBD, HHR, HSR).
 TrapPro – in-RIP trapping solution, supporting trap zone and trapping parameters delivered in PostScript language or PJTF commands within a PDF file, and also configuration within the RIP's GUI. TrapPro includes a number of advanced features such as small object protection, mitered, sliding, anamorphic, narrowed and feathered traps. (Available in HHR, HSR).

Harlequin RIP release history
 V4.0 (1996) – Addition of output plugin to create CIP3 Print Production Format (PPF) files.
 V4.5 (1997) – in-RIP trapping added under the name EasyTrap
 V5.0 (1998) – Addition of support for PostScript LanguageLevel 3 and PDF 1.2 files as well as PostScript 1 and PostScript Level 2. Addition of 'SetGold' a utility used to create 'golden state' profiles for color proofing devices to ensure that neutrals print neutral and that the gamut of the proofer is used optimally.
 V5.1 (1999)
 V5.3 (2000) – Support for PDF 1.3 added, can enforce the PDF/X-1 standard.
 V5.5 (2001)
 V6.0 – Eclipse release (2002) – EasyTrap withdrawn and replaced with TrapPro. Previous versions of in-RIP color management withdrawn and replaced with ColorPro, including support for N-color profiles. Support for PDF 1.4 added, including native interpretation and rendering of live transparency in PDF files. Support for PDF/A-1a and PDF/X-3 added. V6.0 was the first version to run under Mac OS X. SetGold upgraded to SetGold Pro, enabling the creation of full profiles for color proofers.
 V6.4 – Eclipse SP4 (2004) – JDF input support added. Users could now "try before you buy" (TBYB) on layered options such as TrapPro, CIP3 output.
 V7.0 – Genesis release (2005) – Simple imposition and Font emulation added. PDF support extended to version 1.5. Supported on Windows XP.
 V7.1 (2006) – Support for ICC v4.0 profiles added in ColorPro. Print Production Manager (PPM added). PDF support extended to version 1.6.
 V7.2 (2007) – TIFF output plugin extended to support spot colors.
 V8.0 (2008) – Support for XPS and HD Photo added. PDF support extended to version 1.7. New output plugin added to create raster PDFs for soft-proofing & approval. Supported on Windows Vista. Addition of multi-threaded renderer to take advantage of multi-core computers and hyper-threading (earlier versions of the Harlequin RIP offered symmetric multi-processing (SMP) designed for use on computers with multiple CPUs). PDF Retained Raster added.
 V8.1 (2009) – TrapPro enhanced to use less memory. Significant enhancements to performance when rendering live PDF transparency.
 V8.3 (2010) – Expanded support for hybrid and digitally modulated screens. Support for PDF Retained Raster extended to more classes of output device. Supported on Windows 7 and Mac OS X 10.6 (Snow Leopard).
 V9.0 (2011) – Supports more PDF/X variants and PANTONE Plus libraries.
 V10.0 (2014) – Improvements in multithreading and memory management (64-bit version available), so faster ripping and better support for complex jobs.
 V11.0 (2015) – Several improvements including speed, less memory consumption. A 64 bit system is now required, 32 bit is no longer supported.
 V12.0 (2018) – Compliant with the PDF 2.0 standard, In-RIP bar-code generation, dynamic overlays for variable data, improved inkjet quality.
 V12.1 (2019) – Supports Windows BMP interpretation, Seamless screening, non-monotonic screening.  Supported on Windows Server 2019

Harlequin Host Renderer
The Harlequin Host Renderer was launched in 2005; version 1.3 was released in late 2009. Core RIP functionality in HHR has tracked with Harlequin Server RIP except that HHR currently has the following additional features in comparison to HSR 8.3:
 Higher performance, especially when processing live PDF transparency
 Support for PDF/X-4p, PDF/X-5g and PDF/X-5pg, enabling OEMs to create DFEs fully compliant to the PDF/VT standard (ISO 16612-2:2010)
 Support for 2- and 4-bit screening

HHR is supported on Linux and Windows.

Harlequin Embedded SDK
The Harlequin Embedded SDK (EBD) has been optimized for use within home and office printers. To that end it supports several versions of the Printer Control Language (PCL), as well as the Printer Job Language (PJL) and Hewlett-Packard Graphics Language (HPGL).

EBD version 3 was released in 2009. It is supported under a variety of real-time and near-real-time operating systems including Embedded Windows XP, Linux, VxWorks and ThreadX, and on a variety of hardware architectures, including Intel, Freescale and ARM, with or without a system-on-a-chip (SOC) around the CPU. Global Graphics has announced a partnership with Conexant to provide a combination of hardware and Page description language (PDL) software for home and small office printers.

References

PostScript